Jesús Lozoya Solís (March 31, 1910 – May 22, 1983) was a Mexican military physician, pediatrician and politician. He was Governor of Chihuahua (1955-1956).

References

1910 births
1983 deaths
Governors of Chihuahua (state)
Mexican military personnel
Mexican paediatricians
20th-century Mexican physicians
20th-century Mexican politicians
People from Parral, Chihuahua
Institutional Revolutionary Party politicians